The Postal Union Congress is the main international meeting of the Universal Postal Union, used to discuss various issues affecting international postal services, such as legislation, the political climate, and other strategic issues. The first congress was held in Bern, Switzerland in 1874, and was attended by delegates from 22 countries, most of them European.  The meetings are normally held every four years, although they were cancelled during the two World Wars. Extraordinary Meetings can also be called outside the four-year cycle.

Delegates are usually presented with special albums of stamps by the other participating countries, to cover the period since the previous congress.

Quadrennial Congresses

Extraordinary Congresses

References

External links

Universal Postal Union

Postal Union Congress